Slippage may refer to:
Degree of slipping or loosening as result of slipperiness
Slippage (finance), the difference between estimated transaction costs and the amount actually paid
Project slippage, in project planning, the act of missing a deadline
Replication slippage, nucleotide duplications created by DNA polymerase during DNA replication

Entertainment
Slippage (short story collection), a 1997 collection of short stories by Harlan Ellison
 Slippage, an album by Slobberbone
"Slippage", a song by Goldfrapp from Black Cherry